This is a list of division winners and playoff matches in the regionally organized Eccellenza 2009–2010, which is the 6th level of Italian football.

Framework national summary

Eccellenza Abruzzo

1. Montesilvano deducted one point.

Play-off 
Semi-finals

Final

Mosciano qualified to the National play-off.

Play-out 

San Nicola Sulmona and  Penne relegated to the Promozione.

Eccellenza Basilicata

1.Ferrandina and Irsinese deducted one point.

Play-off 
Semi-finals

Final

Angelo Cristofaro qualified to the National play-off.

Play-out 

Final

Banzi relegated to the Promozione.

Eccellenza Calabria

1.Scalea and Praia deducted one point.
2.Acri deducted one point.

Tie-Break for 5th position

Play-off 
Semi-finals

Final

Scalea qualified to the National play-off.

Play-out 

Città di Amantea relegated to the Promozione.

Eccellenza Campania

Girone A

1. The CTL Campania, finished fourth, did not qualify for the playoffs since the separation from the third in the standings, the Arzanese is more than five points. Discourse rather than reaching for the fourth and fifth keeps posting the second, the Internapoli, less than 10 points.
2. Arzanese promoted to fill a vacancy in the Serie D.

Play-off
Semi-final

Final

Arzanese qualified to the National play-off.

Play-out

Parete relegated to the Promozione.

Girone B

1.Ippogrifo Sarno and Agropoli not admitted to the regional playoffs since the separations in the second and third place respectively are greater than 10 and 5 points.

Play-off
Final

Ebolitana qualified to the National play-off.

Play-out

Baia 2006 and Striano relegated to the Promozione.

Eccellenza Emilia-Romagna

Girone A

1. Reno Centese reprieved from relegation to fill a vacancy.
2. Virtus Pavullese promoted to fill a vacancy in the Serie D.

Play-off for first place 

Bagnolese promoted to the Serie D while Virtus Pavullese qualified to the National play-off.

Play-out 

Meletolese and Reno Centese relegated to the Promozione.

Girone B 

1. Comacchio Lidi reprieved from relegation to fill a vacancy.

Play-out 

Stuoie Baracca Lugo and Comacchio Lidi relegated to the Promozione.

Eccellenza Friuli-Venezia Giulia

Play-out 

Rivignano and Sevegliano relegated to the Promozione.

Eccellenza Lazio

Girone A 

1.Virtus Bagnoregio relegated since the separation in the thirteenth and sixteenth place is greater than 10 points.
2.Vigor Cisterna had 3 points deducted.

Play-off for first place 

Fidene promoted to the Serie D while Anziolavinio qualified to the National play-off.

Play-out 

Monterosi relegated to the Promozione.

Girone B

Play-out 

Colleferro and Torrenova relegated to the Promozione.

Eccellenza Liguria

Eccellenza Lombardia

Girone A 

1. The Inveruno, finished third, did not qualify for the playoffs since the separation from the second in the standings, Verbano is more than nine points.
2. Settimo Milanese did not qualify for the playout since the separation from the thirteenth in the standings, Villanterio is more than nine points.
3. Saronno failed to gain promotion and its place was taken by Gallaratese.

Tie-Break for 13th position

Play-out

Girone B

Play-off

Play-out

Girone C

Play-off 

Semi-final

Final

Play-out

Trophy of Regional Campionato Lombardia

Classification 

6
2010